The 2003–04 Danish Superliga season was the 14th season of the Danish Superliga league championship, governed by the Danish Football Association. It took place from the first match on July 26, 2003 to the final match on May 29, 2004.

The Danish champions qualified for UEFA Champions League 2004-05 qualification and the Royal League 2004-05. The runners-up qualified for UEFA Cup 2004-05 qualification and Royal League, while the 3rd and 4th placed teams qualified for UEFA Intertoto Cup 2004 and Royal League. The 11th and 12th placed teams were relegated to the 1st Division. The 1st Division champions and runners-up were promoted to the Superliga.

Table

Results

Top goal scorers

See also
 2003-04 in Danish football

External links
  Netsuperligaen.dk (unofficial site)

Danish Superliga seasons
1
Denmark